Dunham Pond is a  pond in Carver, Massachusetts, United States. The pond is located northeast of Sampsons Pond and southwest of Federal Pond.

External links
Environment Protection Agency

Ponds of Plymouth County, Massachusetts
Ponds of Massachusetts